Arthur Albert 'Esme' Collings (1859 – 28 March 1936) was an English photographer, miniaturist and the first of the loose association of early film pioneers dubbed the Brighton School by French film historian Georges Sadoul. Collings, whose interest in cinematography may have stemmed from his business association with fellow film pioneer William Friese-Greene, was only active in film production for about a year, has left little trace and is, according to film historian Rachael Low, of local importance only.

Biography

Collings was born in Weston-Super-Mare, England sometime late in 1859, with his birth registered in the last quarter of that year. The son of local bootmaker James Collings, he followed his father into the trade, before his artistic ambitions were nurtured by Keturah Anne Beedle, whom he married in 1887.

Around 1887, Collings and his brother James went into partnership with film pioneer William Friese-Greene running two London photographic studios at 69 New Bond Street and 92 Piccadilly. The partnership of Friese Greene & Collings opened a third London studio at 100 Westbourne Grove and a branch at 69 Western Road, Hove, the following year. Friese-Greene's lack of professionalism and perceived financial mismanagement of the business had however resulted in Collings' dissolution of the partnership by the end of that year. Collings retained control of the Bond Street and Hove studios initially with his brother as James Whyte Collings & A. Esme Collings Ltd. but from 1890 onward as Arthur Esme Collings Limited.

By the time of the 1891 census, Arthur Collings, who is listed as an Artist Photographer, was residing with his wife at 59 Dyke Road, Brighton, where their son Arthur Cyril Esme Collings was born the following year. Around 1893, Collings transferred his studio to 120 Western Road, Hove which he retained his name until World War I.

By the summer of 1896, Collings had taken up residence at 13 Alexandra Villas, Hove and begun to build a catalogue of films including Railway Scene, featuring a train arriving at The Dyke railway station mimicking the Lumière Brothers' Train Pulling into a Station, A Victorian Lady in Her Boudoir, an early erotic film, and The Broken Melody, featuring Dutch cellist Auguste van Biene. On 18 September Collings sent his camera to local engineer Alfred Darling for repairs; Darling, who also may have supplied the camera to Collings, would go on to manufacture his own film equipment and assist fellow pioneers George Albert Smith and James Williamson in perfecting their apparatus. Collings films were shown on Chard's Vitagraph as part of an eight-week run at Bristol's Empire Palace of Varieties commencing 19 October. 

In 1897, Collings filmed three scenes based on the popular song Simon the Cellarer for Lewis Sealy to screen accompanied by live singers. A second run of Collings films on Chard's Vitagraph at Bristol's Empire Palace of Varieties commenced the following year. The following year Collings ceased film production to concentrate on miniature portraiture.

By 1906, he had withdrawn from the photography business; closing a second studio he had opened at 89 King's Road, Hove in 1902 and leaving former army officer Richard Berwick Hope in charge of the Western Road studio, Collings returned to London to focus on his painting. Esme Collings (Hove) Ltd, registered to stock broker Albert Winder Grant and photographers Henry Lawrence and William Leonard Staines in July 1910, closed the Bond Street branch in June 1913 and the Western Road branch sometime after 1915.

On 28 March 1936, Collings died at his home in Eastbourne, Sussex.

Family
Collings' wife Keturah Collings (née Beedle), who initially encouraged him to pursue his artistic ambitions, worked as a photographer and portrait artist in a series of London studios from 1905 until her death in 1948.

Legacy
The pioneering film work of Esme Collings, as well as James Williamson and George Albert Smith, was commemorated in the 1966 BBC Television programme It Began in Brighton, produced by Melvyn Bragg and directed by Tristram Powell.

Filmography

References

1859 births
1936 deaths
People from Hove
British cinema pioneers
Cinema pioneers
English film directors
19th-century English photographers
Photographers from Somerset